Pan Am Flight 816 was an international flight from Auckland, New Zealand, to San Francisco, California, via Tahiti, French Polynesia and Los Angeles. It was operated by a Pan Am Boeing 707-321B bearing the registration N417PA and named Clipper Winged Racer. On July 22, 1973, at 10:06 P.M. local time, the Boeing 707 took off from Faa'a International Airport in Papeete. Thirty seconds after takeoff, the airliner, carrying 79 passengers and crew, crashed into the sea.

Aircraft and crew 
N417PA (serial number 18959, manufacturing serial number) had its maiden flight on February 25, 1966, and was delivered to Pan Am on May 21. It was powered by four Pratt & Whitney JT3D-3B turbofan engines.

The captain was Robert M. Evarts of Grass Valley, California, 59, who had 25,275 flight hours, including 8,384 hours on the Boeing 707. Evarts's first officer was Lyle C. Havens, 59, from Medford, Oregon, who had 21,575 flight hours, with 9,248 of them on the Boeing 707. The flight engineer was Isaac N. Lambert, 34, of Danville, California (9,134 flight hours, 4,760 of which were on the Boeing 707). The navigator was Frederick W. Fischer, 32, of Rochester, New York. He had 3,961 flight hours, including 3,945 of them on the Boeing 707.

Preceding events 
The first leg of the flight from Auckland to Papeete was mainly uneventful. However, after landing, the flight crew reported a crack in the cockpit windshield. Procedures (at the time) considered this a minor problem and allowed pilots to continue flying. Nevertheless, the crew notified airline officials in New York City about the issue and requested permission to continue the flight, which was granted. Captain Evarts decided to have the aircraft loaded with additional fuel, expecting a lower flight altitude than usual.  of fuel were loaded instead of the planned .

The communication with New York City and the extra refueling delayed the flight past its intended departure time of 20:30 by 90 minutes. The aircraft would takeoff from the  runway 08. The V speeds were the following:

 V1 = 
 VR =  
 V2 =

Accident description 
At 9:52 PM the crew contacted air traffic control requesting permission to takeoff from runway 04 instead of 08. Two minutes later, Flight 816 began taxiing. The crew then asked if they could be assigned flight level (FL) 230 as their cruising altitude, rather than the intended FL 330 (. At 10:04 PM the controller cleared Flight 816 for takeoff, but the crew did not acknowledge this transmission.

Eyewitnesses reported seeing the aircraft make a sudden 90 degree turn soon after takeoff, along with a flash from the aircraft. The sole survivor reported a loud cracking sound immediately before the crash. At 10:06 PM, the controller heard a loud sound over the radio, saw flashes on the water, and activated the emergency response. A sea search by  naval ships and private craft recovered 12 bodies and one survivor. The rescue teams found two initial survivors; a flight attendant and a passenger. The flight attendant later died of her injuries. The sole survivor of the accident was a passenger, a Canadian citizen. He told investigators that he felt the aircraft was in a dive, took the brace position, and "woke up" in the water. The crash of Flight 816 is the deadliest aviation disaster to occur in French Polynesia.

Investigation 
It is believed that an instrument failure during the climb out turn may have contributed to the accident.

Due to the flight recorders not being found, no official cause was determined.

See also

List of sole survivors of airline accidents or incidents
Other aircraft that crashed shortly after takeoff after pilots lost spatial orientation:
Air India Flight 855
Flash Airlines Flight 604
Northeast Airlines Flight 823
South African Airways Flight 228
Viasa Flight 897

References

External links
 Final accident report (Archive) 

1973 in French Polynesia
Accidents and incidents involving the Boeing 707
Airliner accidents and incidents with an unknown cause
Aviation accidents and incidents in 1973
Aviation accidents and incidents in French Polynesia
816
Tahiti
July 1973 events in Oceania